The 2022 Israeli Basketball National League Cup will be the 2nd edition of the Israeli Basketball National League Cup, organized by the Israel Basketball Association.

On 23 August, 2022, the Israel Basketball Association held the draw for the tournament. The tournament format consists of one-game elimination match.

bracket

Round of 16
The round of 16 will take place on 22 October, 2022. Ironi Nahariya and Hapoel Afula automatically advanced to the quarterfinals.

Quarterfinals

Semifinals

Final

References

Israeli Basketball National League Cup
Cup